Ceraon (Ancient Greek: Κεραων; aka Keraon) in Greek mythology is a demi-god of the meal, specifically the mixing of wine.

See also
 Deipneus

Greek gods